Hendrik Hoppenstedt (born 14 June 1972) is a German politician of the Christian Democratic Union (CDU) who has been serving as a member of the German parliament Bundestag since 2013, representing the Hannover-Land I constituency. Before he got elected in 2013, he was mayor of the city of Burgwedel in the northern German state of Lower Saxony.

Education and early career
Hoppenstedt attended Gymnasium Großburgwedel and Abingdon School before studying law from 1993 until 1999. During his studies, he completed internships at the Bundesrat in Berlin and at the Embassy of Germany in Washington, D.C.
 
From 2002 to 2005, Hoppenstedt worked at Allianz.

Member of the German Bundestag
In his first parliamentary term from 2013 until 2017, Hoppenstedt served as member of the Committee on Legal Affairs and Consumer Protection as well as on the Sub-Committee on European Union Law. Within the Committee on Legal Affairs and Consumer Protection, he was the CDU/CSU parliamentary group's rapporteur on foreign affairs and development policy. In addition, he was an alternate member of the Committee on Foreign Affairs and a full member of the Parliamentary Friendship Group for Relations with Arabic-Speaking States in the Middle East, which is in charge of maintaining inter-parliamentary relations with Bahrain, Irak, Yemen, Jordan, Qatar, Kuwait, Lebanon, Oman, Saudi Arabia, Syria, United Arab Emirates and the Palestinian territories.

In the negotiations to form a coalition government under the leadership of Chancellor Angela Merkel following the 2017 federal elections, Hoppenstedt was part of the working group on urban development, led by Bernd Althusmann, Kurt Gribl and Natascha Kohnen. In the formation of Merkel's fourth cabinet, he was appointed Minister of State for Bureaucracy Reduction and Federal-State Relations at the Federal Chancellery.

Amid the COVID-19 pandemic in Germany, Hoppenstedt co-chaired – alongside Silvia Breher, Tobias Hans,  Yvonne Magwas and Paul Ziemiak – the CDU's first ever digital national convention in 2021. For the 2021 elections, he was elected to lead the CDU campaign in Lower Saxony.

Other activities
 Sparkasse Hannover, Member of the supervisory board (since 2011)
 BHW, Ombudsman (since 2016)

Political positions
In June 2017, Hoppenstedt voted against his parliamentary group's majority and in favor of Germany's introduction of same-sex marriage.

References

External links
 
Bundestag page 

1972 births
Living people
Members of the Bundestag for Lower Saxony
People from Burgwedel
University of Passau alumni
Mayors of places in Lower Saxony
Members of the Bundestag 2021–2025
Members of the Bundestag 2017–2021
Members of the Bundestag 2013–2017
Parliamentary State Secretaries of Germany
Members of the Bundestag for the Christian Democratic Union of Germany